Alejandro Luis Mariano Rovira de los Santos (1917 – 1991) was an Uruguayan politician and diplomat.
He served as a Deputy Prosecutor of the Police, the Interventor of the Immigration Police, Deputy Undersecretary of the Interior, and as a Director of the National Civil Service Office.

Career 
From 1951 to 1967 he was "Director de la Oficina de Migraciones" (Immigration to Uruguay).
In 1970 he was Representative for Montevideo, the Colorado Party (Uruguay) in the Chamber of Deputies of Uruguay.
In 1972 he was President of the State Railways Administration of Uruguay and minister of the Interior of Uruguay.
From 1975 to  he was Ambassador in Jerusalem.
From  to  he was foreign minister of Uruguay and represented the government of Aparicio Méndez at the United Nations General Assembly

Controversy and espionage during the Cold war 

Mr. Rovira operated as an agent for the Czech intelligence agency (STB) under the codename "Veslar". Rovira was one of the 20 collaborators the agency had in Uruguay during the Coldwar and provided the agency with sensible material about the military, the police as well as facilitated visa arrangements for other collaborators while at the Ministry of the Interior. According to the files released by the Czech agency and discovered by researchers Vladimír Petrilák and  Mauro Abranches Kraenski, Rovira was one of the most valuable contacts of the agency, as well as he was considered by agents as an "extreme right wing" character.

Publications
Subversion terrorism revolutionary war: the Uruguayan experience, Monte Video 1981, 29 pages.

References

1917 births
1991 deaths
Interior ministers of Uruguay
Ambassadors of Uruguay to Israel
Foreign ministers of Uruguay